Lin Fengmian (November 22, 1900 – August 12, 1991), originally Lin Fengming, was a Chinese painter and is considered a pioneer of modern Chinese painting for blending Chinese and Western styles, he was one of the earliest Chinese painters to study in Europe. He was also an important innovator in the area of Chinese art education. He was one of the pioneers of Chinese modern art, who earned the title of "The Four Great Academy Presidents".

Biography
Born in Ge Gong Ling village which is located in Meijiang District, Xiyang Baigong Township, in the suburbs of today's Meizhou municipality in Guangdong province, China. His father was a painter and Lin displayed an early fascination for arts and excelled at it. As part of the young Chinese elite, Lin participated in the Diligent Work-Frugal Study Program and went to France. He travelled to Paris with Chinese architect Liu Jipiao and artist Lin Wenzheng and he connected with Chinese artists living in Paris, such as Xu Beihong. Lin spent the early years of his career in Europe, moving to the prestigious Ecole Nationale Superieure des Beaux-Arts in Paris, France in 1920 to study painting in the studio of Fernand Cormon, who also trained other such renowned painters such as Vincent van Gogh, Henri de Toulouse-Lautrec, Emile Bernard, etc. In 1923, he moved to Berlin, Germany for a study tour.

In 1926 he returned to China, where he became the principal of the National Beijing Fine Art School. In 1928, with encouragement from Cai Yuanpei, he founded the Hangzhou National College of Art (now called the China Academy of Art) in Hangzhou, becoming its first principal and taught western painting along with French-trained artists such as Fang Ganmin and Wu Dayu.

Lin's works and life were met with great tragedy. While many of his early works were destroyed by Japanese soldiers during the Sino-Japanese War, many of his later works were destroyed during the Cultural Revolution. After being heavily criticized and denounced by the Gang of Four, a Chinese political faction, Lin personally destroyed his own works by soaking and then flushing his works down the toilet; however, he still ended up being imprisoned for over four years. Zhou Enlai finally approved his release papers. After his release, Lin slowly began to recreate many of his previously destroyed works.

In 1977, thanks to the assistance of Marshall Ye Jianying, who is also from Meizhou, he was allowed to leave China on the assumption that he could reunite with his family in Brazil. He visited his family on several occasions in Brazil but settled in Hong Kong, where he remained until his death in 1991.

Fengmian's artwork is featured in museum art collections, including: The Metropolitan Museum of Art, the Cernuschi museum and the Art Gallery of New South Wales.

In April 2021 Lin's painting The Fiery Battle Of Red Cliffs was sold for HK$9,855,000 at the Sotheby's Spring sales in Hong Kong.

References

External links
The Lin Fengmian Family Collection
A Brief Biography of and Painting by Lin Fengmian
Lin Fengmian's Paintings at China Online Museum

1900 births
1991 deaths
Educators from Guangdong
Republic of China painters
Painters from Guangdong
Hakka people
Hong Kong people of Hakka descent
People from Meixian District
Academic staff of the École des Beaux-Arts
Academic staff of China Academy of Art
Victims of the Cultural Revolution
Artists from Meizhou